Amdah Union is a union parishad situated at Meherpur Sadar Upazila,  in Meherpur District, Khulna Division of Bangladesh. There are 12 villages and 5 mouzas in the union.

References

External links
 

Unions of Meherpur Sadar Upazila
Unions of Meherpur District
Unions of Khulna Division